The term terra rosa (a misspelling of 'terra rossa', Italian for "red soil") can refer to:
 Terra rosa (soil), a red clay soil produced by the weathering of limestone
 Terra rosa (colour), a red colour
 Terra Rosa (band), a Japanese hard rock band